John McCutcheon (March 6, 1879 – September 16, 1942) was the New Jersey State Comptroller and the Passaic County Clerk.

Biography
He was born on March 6, 1879, in Paterson, New Jersey. He was the Passaic County Clerk when he ran for New Jersey State Comptroller in 1929. He died on September 16, 1942, in a car accident.

References

New Jersey State Comptrollers
Politicians from Paterson, New Jersey
People from Wanaque, New Jersey
Road incident deaths in New Jersey
1879 births
1942 deaths